The Midland Railway 156 Class was a class of  tender engines built at Derby Works between 1866 and 1874. In total 29 of the class were built under the Midland Railway. They were rebuilt sometime between 1873 and 1903.

History 	
These engines used to work on express passenger trains to King's Cross, which was then the Midland Railway's London Terminus. 21 survived to become part of the London, Midland and Scottish Railway (LMS) fleet of engines in 1923. By then they were reduced to the humblest of roles. In September 1930, the LMS recognised the significance of the class and number 156 itself was ear-marked for preservation. However, William Stanier chose not to preserve it and the engine was scrapped two years later.

Preservation
One engine, 158A (originally built as 158 before subsequently renumbered to that number, then it became Midland Railway's No. 2 in 1907, and finally 20002 by the LMS in 1934) survives. She was withdrawn from service in July 1947 as a station pilot at Nottingham station by the LMS to be restored to her former Midland identity and old number 158A as a static exhibit in Birmingham during the centenary celebrations at the New Street station in 1954. 

The locomotive was preserved at Derby Works until being moved to the National Railway Museum. She was placed on loan to the Midland Railway – Butterley in Butterley, Derbyshire in 1975 and remained on display there until 2021. Following cosmetic attention at the Locomotion Museum in Shildon, the locomotive was placed on a three-year loan to Barrow Hill Engine Shed from August 2022. The surviving example is not in as built condition. It has twice been reboilered and the front end rebuilt. The original tender was replaced a century ago. The tender that is now attached to 158A is the tender from Midland Railway 700 Class No. 2846.

References

External links 

0156
2-4-0 locomotives
Railway locomotives introduced in 1866
Standard gauge steam locomotives of Great Britain